Proterorhinus is a genus of fishes, known as the tubenose gobies. These gobiid fish are native to Eurasia where they occur in the region of the Caspian and Black seas, inhabiting marine, brackish and fresh waters. The species Proterorhinus semilunaris (previously referred to as P. marmoratus) was introduced to the St. Clair River in Michigan during the late 1990s. Until recently, the genus was considered monotypic, comprising only the tubenose goby (Proterorhinus marmoratus). Following molecular and further morphological investigations it has been split into several taxa, with distinct distributions in marine vs. fresh waters and in the Black Sea vs. Caspian Sea basins.

Species

There are five recognized species in this genus:
 Proterorhinus marmoratus (Pallas, 1814) (tubenose goby)
 Proterorhinus nasalis (De Filippi, 1863) (eastern tubenose goby)
 Proterorhinus semilunaris (Heckel, 1837) (western tubenose goby)
 Proterorhinus semipellucidus (Kessler, 1863) (P. nasalis).
 Proterorhinus tataricus Freyhof & Naseka, 2007 (Chornaya tubenose goby)

References

 
Benthophilinae
Taxonomy articles created by Polbot